Ilias Iliaskos (1 January 1908 – ) was a Greek footballer who played as a forward.

Club career

Iliaskos was born in Constantinople in 1908 and in 1926 traveled to Greece and settled in Athens. He became the first student of the Athens College. In 1927 he started playing football at AEK Athens and established himself at the club as one of the main attackers. On 8 November 1931 he scored the first of the five goals of his team in the first Greek Cup final, defeating Aris with a score of 5–3. That was the first title of the club in their 7 years of existence. He played at the "yellow-blacks" until 1933, when at the age of 25, he retired from football.

International career
Iliaskos played in one match for Greece on 27 March 1932 in a friendly 1–2 defeat against Bulgaria, at Leoforos Alexandras Stadium.

See also
List of one-club men in association football

Honours

AEK Athens
Greek Cup: 1931–32

References

External links

"The History of AEK", Edition "G.X. Alexandris, Athens 1996Ethnic Greece's march through time, Papazisi Publications Athens 2001
The official site of the amateur AEKAlmanac'' Pictures Magazine, 1991

1908 births
Footballers from Istanbul
Constantinopolitan Greeks
Emigrants from the Ottoman Empire to Greece
Greek footballers
Greece international footballers
Association football forwards
AEK Athens F.C. players